Kenneth R. Sikkema (born February 10, 1951) is a Republican politician from Michigan who served in both houses of the Michigan Legislature between 1987 and 2006 representing areas in and around Grand Rapids.

Sikkema served as Republican Leader in the House in the 89th Legislature, and as the Majority Leader of the Senate in the 92nd and 93rd Legislatures.

References

1951 births
Living people
Republican Party members of the Michigan House of Representatives
Republican Party Michigan state senators
People from Cadillac, Michigan
People from Wyoming, Michigan
Harvard University alumni
Ross School of Business alumni
20th-century American politicians
21st-century American politicians